Agafangel is an old and rare Russian Christian male first name. The name is derived from the Greek name Agathangelos, which in turn derives from the words agathos—meaning kind, good—and angelos—meaning bearer of news, messenger.

The diminutives of "Agafangel" are Aga, Fanya, and Agafangelka.

The patronymics derived from "Agafangel" are "" (Agafangelovich; masculine) and "" (Agafangelovna; feminine).

References

Notes

Sources
Н. А. Петровский (N. A. Petrovsky). "Словарь русских личных имён" (Dictionary of Russian First Names). ООО Издательство "АСТ". Москва, 2005. 
А. В. Суперанская (A. V. Superanskaya). "Современный словарь личных имён: Сравнение. Происхождение. Написание" (Modern Dictionary of First Names: Comparison. Origins. Spelling). Айрис-пресс. Москва, 2005. 

